= Bowling at the 2010 South American Games – Mixed doubles =

The Mixed doubles event at the 2010 South American Games was held on March 26 at 9:00.

== Medalists ==
Gold	Silver	Bronze
David Romero; Anggie Ramírez; Colombia	Sebastian Montalbetti; Maria de las Mercedes de la Losa; Argentina	Walter Costa; Jacqueline Costa; Brazil

== Results ==
Rank	Team	Athlete	Games						Total	Avg	Grand
Rank	Team	Athlete	G1	G2	G3	G4	G5	G6	Total	Avg	Grand
1st place, gold medalist(s)	Colombia	David Romero (COL)	196	225	233	219	174	245	1292	215.3	2576
1st place, gold medalist(s)	Colombia	Anggie Ramírez (COL)	214	243	157	225	231	214	1284	214.0	2576
2nd place, silver medalist(s)	Argentina	Sebastian Montalbetti (ARG)	235	171	234	222	277	164	1303	217.2	2566
2nd place, silver medalist(s)	Argentina	Maria de las Mercedes de la Losa (ARG)	277	194	226	204	193	169	1263	210.5	2566
3rd place, bronze medalist(s)	Brazil	Walter Costa (BRA)	215	180	215	176	168	171	1125	187.5	2477
3rd place, bronze medalist(s)	Brazil	Jacqueline Costa (BRA)	244	269	174	226	191	248	1352	225.3	2477
4	Chile	Pablo Alejandro Pohl (CHI)	186	215	268	206	193	196	1264	210.7	2347
4	Chile	Maria Virginia Soto (CHI)	126	203	177	234	159	184	1083	180.5	2347
5	Venezuela	Danny Fung Sun (VEN)	179	215	170	201	221	228	1214	2020.3	2315
5	Venezuela	Joan Patricia Gonzalez (VEN)	156	208	174	203	180	180	1101	183.5	2315
6	Netherlands Antilles	Emiel Samander (AHO)	173	182	216	179	190	197	1137	189.5	2244
6	Netherlands Antilles	Samantha Rodriguez Mensing (AHO)	202	201	185	202	174	143	1107	184.5	2244
7	Peru	Victor Ricardo Takechi (PER)	165	202	167	186	184	164	1068	178.0	2108
7	Peru	Tatiana Velasquez (PER)	165	149	207	178	172	169	1040	173.3	2108
8	Aruba	Errol Brown (ARU)	201	172	177	174	169	234	1127	187.8	1982
8	Aruba	Bettiza Koolman (ARU)	136	146	127	140	156	150	855	142.5	1982
9	Paraguay	Alejandro Ignacio Lopez (PAR)	182	180	166	150	147	206	1031	171.8	1953
9	Paraguay	Umayahara Kudo Chie (PAR)	148	155	182	136	147	154	922	153.7	1953
